Edward III's chevauchée of 1355 took place when King Edward III of England led an army into Picardy in the hope of provoking the French into a battle. Edward's son The Black Prince had begun a chevauchée on 5 October with an Anglo-Gascon force from Bordeaux heading towards Narbonne.

Campaign

On 2 November 1355 King Edward III of England led an army of 9,000–10,000 men from the English enclave of Calais into French-held Picardy. He hoped to draw the larger French army, under the French king, JohnII, into a battle.  John declined, ordering a scorched earth policy and harassing the English communications. After reaching Hesdin Edward returned to Calais on 11 November.

Citations and sources

Citations

Sources

 
 

1350s in France
Military history of the Pas-de-Calais
Conflicts in 1355
Edward III of England
1355 in England
Hundred Years' War, 1337–1360